HMS Theseus was a 74-gun third-rate ship of the line of the Royal Navy.

One of the eight  ships designed by Thomas Slade, she was built at Perry, Blackwall Yard, London and launched on 25 September 1786.

Service
Theseus was the flagship of Rear Admiral Horatio Nelson's fleet for the 1797 Battle of Santa Cruz de Tenerife. Day to day command was vested in her flag captain Ralph Willett Miller. The British were soundly defeated and Nelson was wounded by a musket ball while aboard the Theseus, precipitating the amputation of his right arm.

Despite the defeat, morale and good order were retained aboard the ship. In August 1797 ship's surgeon Robert Tainsh reported a mere nine cases of illness aboard, with little incidence of scurvy and a ready supply of antiscorbutics. An outbreak of ulcers was attributed to the overuse of salted provisions and addressed by Miller's insistence on ensuring a supply of onions and lemons as part of daily rations. Also with Miller's approval, the lower deck ports were periodically washed with nitrous acid to reduce the risk of mould, windsails were installed to encourage a flow of fresh air below decks and the crew's hammocks were ordered to be aired three times a week.

Battle of the Nile
In 1798, Theseus took part in the decisive Battle of the Nile, under the command of Captain Ralph Willett Miller. The Royal Navy fleet was outnumbered, at least in firepower, by the French fleet, which boasted the 118-gun ship-of-the-line  L'Orient, three 80-gun warships and nine of the popular 74-gun ships. The Royal Navy fleet in comparison had just thirteen 74-gun ships and one 50-gun fourth-rate.

The French frigate Artemise surrendered to the British, with the crew setting fire to their ship to prevent it falling into the hands of the British. Two other French ships Heureux and Mercure ran aground and soon surrendered after a brief encounter with three British warships, one of which was Theseus.

The battle was a success for the Royal Navy, as well as for the career of Admiral Nelson. It cut supply lines to the French army in Egypt, whose wider objective was to threaten British India.  The casualties were heavy; the French suffered over 1,700 killed, over 600 wounded and 3,000 captured. The British suffered 218 dead and 677 wounded. Nine French warships were captured and two destroyed. Two other French warships managed to escape. Theseus had five sailors killed and thirty wounded, included one officer and five Royal Marines.

Siege of Acre
Theseus played a less successful role in the 1799 Siege of Acre, under the command of Captain Ralph Willett Miller. On 13 May 1799 she reached the nearby port of Caesarea, and Miller ordered the ship readied for action in bombarding Acre the following morning. A large quantity of ammunition was brought to the deck for use by the ship's guns, including more than 70 18-pound and 36-pound shells. At 9.30am on the 14th, the ammunition was accidentally ignited while the ship was under way. The resulting explosion set fire to the deck, mainmast and mizzen mast, and killed Miller and 25 other men. Another 45 crew members were injured.

Flames quickly spread between Theseus decks, and a second detonation of ammunition stores destroyed the poop and quarterdecks and toppled the main mast over the starboard bow. A further ten men were killed before the fire was brought under control, leaving the ship unserviceable for the Acre campaign.

Later service
Four years later a refitted Theseus took part in the Blockade of Saint-Domingue in 1803, under Captain John Bligh. 

She also took part in the Battle of the Basque Roads in 1809. Lord Cochrane initiated a daring attack, led by fire ships and other explosive vessels, in an attempt to cause chaos among their target, an anchored French squadron. Many of the French ships were subsequently run aground due to the havoc that this attack caused. The enemy squadron would probably have been completely destroyed had the Commander-in-Chief, Admiral Lord Gambier, not hesitated over necessary decisions, such as to deploy the main fleet which instead lay in wait for their orders. Thus the remnants of the French escaped destruction.

Theseus was broken up at Chatham in 1814.

In popular culture
In the Patrick O'Brian novel Master and Commander, Capt. Jack Aubrey is said to have served aboard HMS Theseus early in his career.

Citations

References

External links
 

Ships of the line of the Royal Navy
Culloden-class ships of the line
1786 ships
Ships built by the Blackwall Yard